Extreme Assault is a video game developed by Blue Byte.

Development
The development of the game started in February 1996. The game was developed by 14 people.

Reception

Extreme Assault received mostly positive reviews. Most critics remarked that the game features stunning graphics even without the use of graphics acceleration cards, and approved of the use of lowbrow, accessible gameplay more commonly associated with console games than PC games. Next Generation disagreed on both points, contending that the graphics only look good if the optional 3dfx card is used, and that the simplistic gameplay and limited story will quickly bore the player. GamePro defended the game with the claim: "While it may be a little short on plot, Extreme Assault has something for every gamer..."

GamePro and The Electric Playground both also said the controls are easy to handle even when using just a keyboard. The Electric Playgrounds reviewer also lauded the difficulty curve, saying that "I found myself constantly and fairly challenged throughout the game". In contrast, GameSpot complained that the game's difficulty is "brutal", and criticized the fact that easy mode only allows one to play a portion of the game.

Notes

References

External links

1997 video games
Alien invasions in video games
Blue Byte games
Combat flight simulators
DOS games
DOS-only games
Helicopter video games
Tank simulation video games
Video games developed in Germany
Video games scored by Chris Huelsbeck
Video games scored by Fabian Del Priore